Bogorodskoye Urban Settlement is the name of several municipal formations in Russia.

Bogorodskoye Urban Settlement, a municipal formation which the Urban-Type Settlement of Bogorodskoye in Bogorodsky District of Kirov Oblast is incorporated as
Bogorodskoye Urban Settlement, a municipal formation which the Work Settlement of Bogorodskoye in Sergiyevo-Posadsky District of Moscow Oblast is incorporated as

See also
Bogorodsky (disambiguation)

References

Notes

Sources

